Arshty (Äršte) is a rural locality (a selo) in Sunzhensky District of the Republic of Ingushetia, Russia, located on left bank of the river Arshtynka near the border with the Republic of Chechnya. It forms the municipality of the rural settlement of Arshty as the only settlement in its composition.

Geography 
The village is located on the left bank of the Arshtynka River, just above its confluence with Faetonka, 20 km south of the regional center - the city of Sunzha and 26 km east of the capital of the republic - the city of Magas.

The nearest settlements are: in the north - the village of Chemulga, in the northeast - the village of Bamut and in the southwest - Akati farm.

History 
In the second half of the 18th century (1770s), the German researcher J. A. Güldenstädt indicates Arshty and some other Orstkhoy villages among the total number of Ingush villages and districts proper. During the Caucasian War, the village was the center of the Vilayet Arshty, an administrative unit of the Caucasian Imamate. Since 1861, Arshty has been in the Ingushskiy okrug of the Terek Oblast. As a result of the eviction of the Orstkhoys to Turkey in 1865, including to the village of Arshty, an intensive resettlement of the Malkhists and Maystins began. Since 1924, the village of Arshty, together with neighboring Bamut, was part of Ingush Autonomous Oblast. According to the Soviet Census in 1926, upper Arshty had population of 303, 303 people of Ingush ethnicity. Lower Arshty had population of 550, 546 people of Ingush ethnicity.

In 1944, after the Deportation of Chechens and Ingush and the abolition of the Chechen-Ingush Autonomous Soviet Socialist Republic, the village of Arshty was renamed Dubravino.

After the restoration of the Chechen-Ingush Autonomous Soviet Socialist Republic, in 1958 the settlement was returned to its former name - Arshty.

During the First Chechen war on February 22, 1996, the village was shelled by Russian troops by mistake, as the Russian soldiers had a misconception that Chechen rebels were hiding in Arshty. This incident killed ten people, mostly women.

Notable people 
 Mustafa Arshtinskiy — naib of Imam Shamil and commander of the sabotage detachment, which committed raids on Russian royal fortifications during the Caucasian War.

References

Bibliography 
 
 
 
 
 

Rural localities in Ingushetia